Blood, Sweat & Tears is the third studio album by American rapper Ace Hood. The album was released on August 9, 2011, by Dollaz N Dealz Entertainment, We the Best Music Group and Island Def Jam. The album features guest appearances from T-Pain, Kevin Cossom, Yo Gotti, Chris Brown, Rick Ross and Lil Wayne.

Singles
The album's first single, "Hustle Hard" was released on March 1, 2011. The album's second single, "Go 'N' Get It" was released on June 14, 2011. The album's third single, "Body 2 Body" featuring Chris Brown was released on July 26, 2011. The music video for "Body 2 Body" featuring Chris Brown, premiered on July 27, 2011.

Commercial performance
Blood, Sweat & Tears debuted at number 8 on the Billboard 200, with first-week sales of 26,000 copies in the United States.

Track listing

Notes
(co.) as co-producer.

Charts

Weekly charts

Year-end charts

References 

2011 albums
Ace Hood albums
Albums produced by Lex Luger
Albums produced by J.U.S.T.I.C.E. League
Albums produced by Sonny Digital
Albums produced by the Runners
Def Jam Recordings albums
Albums produced by Cardiak